Peter Dain Suber (born November 8, 1951) is a philosopher specializing in the philosophy of law and open access to knowledge. He is a Senior Researcher at the Berkman Klein Center for Internet & Society, Director of the Harvard Office for Scholarly Communication, and Director of the Harvard Open Access Project (HOAP). Suber is known as a leading voice in the open access movement, and as the creator of the game Nomic.

Education
Suber graduated from Earlham College in 1973, received a PhD degree in philosophy in 1978, writing a dissertation on Søren Kierkegaard and a Juris Doctor degree in 1982, both from Northwestern University.

Career
Previously, Suber was senior research professor of philosophy at Earlham College, the open access project director at Public Knowledge, a senior researcher at Scholarly Publishing and Academic Resources Coalition (SPARC),.  He is a member of the Board of Enabling Open Scholarship, the Advisory Boards at the Wikimedia Foundation, the Open Knowledge Foundation, and the advisory boards of other organizations devoted to open access and an information commons.

Suber worked as a stand-up comic from 1976 to 1981, including an appearance on The Tonight Show Starring Johnny Carson in 1976. Suber returned to Earlham College as a professor from 1982 to 2003 where he taught classes on philosophy, law, logic, and Kant's Critique of Pure Reason, among other topics.

Suber participated in the 2001 meeting that led to the world's first major international open access initiative, the Budapest Open Access Initiative.  He wrote Open Access News and the SPARC Open Access Newsletter, considered the most authoritative blog and newsletter on open access.  He is also the founder of the Open Access Tracking Project, and co-founder, with Robin Peek, of the Open Access Directory.

In philosophy, Suber is the author of The Paradox of Self-Amendment, the first book-length study of self-referential paradoxes in law, and The Case of the Speluncean Explorers: Nine New Opinions, the first book-length "rehearing" of Lon Fuller's classic, fictional case.  He has also written many articles on self-reference, ethics, formal and informal logic, the philosophy of law, and the history of philosophy.

He has written many articles on open access to science and scholarship.  His 2012 book, Open Access, was published by MIT Press and released under a Creative Commons license. His latest book is a collection of 44 of his most influential articles about open access, Knowledge Unbound: Selected Writings on Open Access, 2002–2010, also published by MIT Press under a Creative Commons license.

Suber has directed the development of TagTeam since its start in 2011. TagTeam is an open-source, social-tagging platform developed for the Harvard Open Access Project at the Berkman Klein Center for Internet & Society at Harvard University.

Honours and awards
Lingua Franca magazine named Suber one of Academia's 20 Most Wired Faculty in 1999. Readers of The Charleston Advisor gave him a special Readers' Choice Award in October 2006, "Non-Librarian Working for Our Cause."   The American Library Association named him the winner of the Lyman Ray Patterson Copyright Award for 2011. Choice named his book on Open Access "an Outstanding Academic Title for 2013."

Personal life
Suber is married to Liffey Thorpe, professor emerita of Classics at Earlham College, with whom he has two daughters. Since 2003, he and Thorpe have resided in Brooksville, Maine.

His mother was Grace Mary Stern, who served in both houses of the Illinois state legislature.

Selected publications
 Knowledge Unbound (MIT Press, 2016)
  . Updates and supplements
 The Case of the Speluncean Explorers: Nine New Opinions (Routledge, 1998)
 The Paradox of Self-Amendment: A Study of Logic, Law, Omnipotence, and Change (Peter Lang Publishing, 1990)
 Self-Reference: Reflections on Reflexivity, co-edited with Steven J. Bartlett (Martinus Nijhoff, 1987)

Notes

References

Further reading

External links 

Suber's home page
Open Access News (Suber's former blog, May 2002 - April 2010)
SPARC Open Access Newsletter (SOAN) (Suber's former newsletter, March 2001 - June 2013)
Peter Suber's Writings on Open Access
Peter Suber's writings on philosophy and other subjects
Harvard Open Access Project (HOAP)
Open Access Directory (OAD)
Open Access Tracking Project (OATP)

1951 births
Access to Knowledge activists
American bloggers
American philosophers
American stand-up comedians
Berkman Fellows
Living people
Open access activists
Copyright activists
Copyright scholars
People from Highland Park, Illinois
People from Brooksville, Maine
Earlham College alumni
Earlham College faculty
Northwestern University alumni
Northwestern University Pritzker School of Law alumni
Wikimedia Foundation Advisory Board members
Articles containing video clips
Comedians from Illinois
Scholarly communication
21st-century American non-fiction writers
21st-century American comedians